Chilatherina pricei, commonly known as Price's rainbowfish, is a species of rainbowfish only found on Yapen Island. The species was described by Gerald R. Allen and Samuel J. Renyaan in 1996, and was named after David Price, who collected the type specimen for this species.

Distribution and habitat
Chilatherina pricei is endemic to Yapen, Cenderawasih Bay, Western New Guinea, Indonesia, where it is found in the main channel of the Reifafeif river system over boulders or rocks. Price's rainbowfish is sometimes found with the Melanotaenia japenensis, despite it generally not occurring in the main channel of the Reifafeif river.

Description
It looks similar to Chilatherina fasciata, but has a blunter snout.

References

pricei
Taxa named by Gerald R. Allen
Taxa named by Samuel Jafet Renyaan
Fish described in 1996